María del Carmen Chaves Calvo (born 13 January 1967 in Hospitalet de Llobregat) is a cyclist from Spain.  She has a disability: she is blind.  She competed at the 1996 Summer Paralympics. She finished third in the tandem road race.

References 

Spanish female cyclists
Living people
1967 births
Paralympic bronze medalists for Spain
Cyclists at the 1996 Summer Paralympics
Sportspeople from L'Hospitalet de Llobregat
Medalists at the 1996 Summer Paralympics
Paralympic medalists in cycling
Paralympic cyclists of Spain
Cyclists from Catalonia
20th-century Spanish women